Daseae or Daseai, also known as Dasea (Δασέα), was a town of ancient Arcadia in the district Parrhasia. It was situated on the road from Megalopolis to Phigalea, 7 stadia from Macareae, and 29 stadia from Megalopolis. It was in ruins in the time of Pausanias (2nd century), as its inhabitants had been removed to Megalopolis upon the foundation of the latter (371 BCE). Its name was apparently derived from the thick woods.

Its site is tentatively located near the modern Apiditsa.

References

External links
 Ancient Dasses on GTP Travel Pages

See also
List of Ancient Greek cities

Populated places in ancient Arcadia
Former populated places in Greece
Cities in ancient Peloponnese
Parrhasia